

Highway and road tunnels
Highways
Bôrik Tunnel (in operation, D1 highway, E50 route, 999 m / 993 m)
Branisko Tunnel (in operation, D1 highway, E50 route, 4 975 m)
Čebrať Tunnel (under construction, D1 highway, E50 route, 2,026 m)
Horelica Tunnel (in operation, D3 highway, E75 route, 605 m)
Lučivná Tunnel (in operation, D1 highway, E50 route, 250 m)
Ovčiarsko Tunnel (in operation, D1 highway, E50 route, 2,375 m)
Poľana Tunnel (in operation, D3 highway, E75 route, 897 m)
Považský Chlmec Tunnel (in operation, D3 highway, E75 route, 2,217 m)
Šibeník Tunnel (in operation, D1 highway, E50 route, 593 m)
Sitina Tunnel (in operation, D2 highway, E65 route, 1440 m / 1415 m)
Svrčinovec Tunnel (in operation, D3 highway, E75 route, 445 m)
Višňové Tunnel (under construction, D1 highway, E50 route, 7460 m)
Žilina Tunnel (in operation, D1 highway, E50 route, 674 m)
Road
Stratenský Tunnel (in operation since 1971, state road 67, Rožňava district, 326 m)

Railway tunnels
There are 76 railway tunnels in use in Slovakia. Most significant are:
The longest ever: Harmanec Tunnel (in operation, Banská Bystrica - Dolná Štubňa track, 4,698 m)
The longest double-track and electrified: Bujanov Tunnel (in operation, Margecany - Košice track, 3,411 m)
The oldest (1848): Lamačský Tunnel (in operation, Bratislava - Kúty track, 704 m)
Last opened (2013): Turecký vrch Tunnel (in operation, Bratislava - Žilina track, 1,775 m)
The shortest: Turček Tunnel, (in operation, Zvolen - Diviaky track, 37.7 m)
Highest by attitude: Tunel Vyšné Hágy (out of operation, Vyšné Hágy sanatorium area, 170 m length, 1123 meters above sea level)
Besides these there are 9 more railway tunnels, which are abandoned or never finished and 2 more railway tunnels under construction. 
There is a tramway tunnel in Bratislava, too.

See also
List of tunnels by location

References

Slovakia
Tunnels
 
Tunnels